Darrin Canniff (born  1966) is a Canadian politician who has served as current the mayor of Chatham-Kent since 2018. 

Canniff was born and raised in Chatham, Ontario. He attended elementary school at Winston Churchill School  and high school at John McGregor Secondary School, and was educated at Wilfrid Laurier University, where he earned a Bachelor of Business Administration degree and received a Chartered Accountant (CA) designation. He received his CA while working for accounting firm KPMG.

Career

Early career 
Prior to entering politics, Canniff worked for Union Gas, where he was the director of planning and forecasting. He has also worked for Transform SSO and Greenfield Specialty Alcohols. He also led a number of charitable campaigns, such as  such as the Festival of Giving and the 2006 United Way of Chatham-Kent campaign. He also served as a board chair at Mainstreet Credit Union, and was a board director for the Children's Treatment Centre Foundation of Chatham-Kent, past chair of the Prosperity Roundtable and past chair of Entegrus Inc.

Politics 
Canniff first entered politics in the 2014 municipal elections, when he was elected to Chatham-Kent Municipal Council as one of six councillors for Ward 6 (Chatham). During his first term he served as co-chair of the 2018 International Plowing Match which was held in Pain Court.

Canniff was first elected as mayor in the 2018 municipal elections, defeating Alysson Storey and incumbent mayor Randy Hope, winning more than 56% of the vote. Canniff ran on a platform prioritizing "quality jobs" and "infrastructure". Hope had been seeking a fourth term as mayor, despite having promised to only serve for three terms. He had also been criticized for making business trips abroad. 

After being elected as mayor, Canniff stated his priorities for 2019 could be summed in the statement "bringing community together", with one of his initiatives being 'Get Involved CK Campaign' to support volunteerism. He also planned on investing in local service clubs, which would result in a small tax increase.  In his first year as mayor, he had to deal with an ice jam in the Thames River which caused flooding and the opening of a new casino in Chatham. Canniff's top priorities in 2020 have been dealing with shoreline erosion, high speed internet and the reopening Talbot Trail.

References 

Mayors of Chatham-Kent
Living people
1960s births
Wilfrid Laurier University alumni
Canadian accountants